Tachi Palace Fights 8 was a mixed martial arts event held by Tachi Palace Fights (TPF) on February 18, 2011, at the Tachi Palace Hotel & Casino in Lemoore, California.

Results

References

Tachi Palace Fights events
2011 in mixed martial arts
Mixed martial arts in California
Sports in Lemoore, California
2011 in sports in California